The Bezirksoberliga Oberpfalz was the seventh tier of the German football league system in the Bavarian Regierungsbezirk of Upper Palatinate (German: Oberpfalz). Until the introduction of the 3. Liga in 2008 it was the sixth tier of the league system, until the introduction of the Regionalligas in 1994 the fifth tier.

The league was disbanded at the end of the 2011–12 season, when major changes to the Bavarian football league system were carried out. Above the Bezirksoberligas, the Landesligas were expanded in number from three to five divisions and the Bezirke have two to three regional leagues, the Bezirksligas, as its highest level again, similar to the system in place until 1988.

Overview
The Bezirksoberligas in Bavaria were introduced in 1988 to create a highest single-division playing level for each of the seven Bezirke.

Before the introduction of the Bezirksoberligas, the Bezirksliga was the level of play below the Landesliga. The Bezirksliga Oberpfalz-Nord and Oberpfalz-Süd fed the Landesliga Bayern-Mitte as they afterwards fed the Bezirksoberliga Oberpfalz.

The winner of the Bezirksoberliga Oberpfalz, like the winner of the Bezirksoberliga Niederbayern and Bezirksoberliga Mittelfranken, was directly promoted to the Landesliga Bayern-Mitte. The second placed teams out of those leagues played-off for another promotion spot with the 15th placed team out of the Landesliga for the last spot there. However, in some years additional promotion places were available in the Landesliga.

The three bottom teams of the Bezirksoberliga were relegated to the Bezirksliga, the team just above those faced a play-off against the second placed Bezirksliga teams.

With the league reform at the end of the 2011–12 season, which includes an expansion of the number of Landesligas from three to five, the Bezirksoberligas were disbanded. Instead, the Bezirksligas took the place of the Bezirksoberligas below the Landesligas once more.

The clubs from the Bezirksoberliga joined the following leagues:
 Champions : Promotion round to the Bayernliga, winners to the Bayernliga, losers to the Landesliga.
 Teams placed 2nd to 6th: Directly qualified to the Landesliga.
 Team placed 7th : Two additional Landesliga places to be determined in a play-off round with the Bezirksliga champions, losers enter Bezirksliga.
 Teams placed 8th to 19th: Directly relegated to Bezirksliga.

Winners and runners-up
The following teams have won or finished runners-up in the league:

 Promoted teams in bold. 
 + Teams finished on equal points, decider needed to determine final position.

Multiple winners
The following clubs have won the league more than once:

League placings
The final placings in the league since its interception:

Key

 S = No of seasons in league (as of 2011-12)

Notes
 1 In 2011, SpVgg Weiden declared insolvency in the Regionalliga and was relegated to the Bezirksoberliga Oberpfalz, taking the place of its reserve side.
 2 In 1995, 1. FC Amberg was declared bankrupt and folded. A new club, the FC Amberg, was formed, initially within the TV Amberg.
 3 The FC Linde Schwandorf folded in 2002 and reformed as FT Eintracht Schwandorf.
 4 In 2008, the TB Regenstauf merged with ASV Regenstauf to form TB/ASV Regenstauf.

References

Sources
 Die Bayernliga 1945 - 1997,  published by the DSFS, 1998
 50 Jahre Bayrischer Fussball-Verband  50-year-anniversary book of the Bavarian FA, publisher: Vindelica Verlag, published: 1996

External links 
 Bayrischer Fussball Verband (Bavarian FA)  
 Upper Palatinate branch of the Bavarian FA  
 Das deutsche Fussball Archiv  Historic German league tables
 Bavarian League tables and results  
 Website with tables and results from the Bavarian Oberliga to Bezirksliga 

Defunct football leagues in Bavaria
Football in Upper Palatinate
1988 establishments in West Germany
2012 disestablishments in Germany
Oberpfalz
Sports leagues established in 1988